Elixane Lechemia and Ingrid Neel defeated Mihaela Buzărnescu and Anna-Lena Friedsam in the final, 6–3, 6–4, to win the doubles tennis title at the 2021 Copa Colsanitas. It was the duo's first individual career Women's Tennis Association (WTA) doubles titles.

Zoe Hives and Astra Sharma were the defending champions from when the tournament was last held in 2019. Neither defended their title together; Sharma played alongside Aliona Bolsova but lost in the semifinals to Lechemia and Neel, and Hives did not return to compete.

Seeds

Draw

Draw

References

External Links
Main Draw

Copa Colsanitas - Doubles
2021 Doubles